Protein flightless-1 homolog is a protein that in humans is encoded by the FLII gene.

This gene encodes a protein with a gelsolin-like actin binding domain and an N-terminal leucine-rich repeat-protein protein interaction domain. The protein is similar to a Drosophila protein involved in early embryogenesis and the structural organization of indirect flight muscle. The gene is located within the Smith-Magenis syndrome region on chromosome 17.

Interactions
FLII has been shown to interact with LRRFIP1 and TRAF interacting protein.

References

Further reading